Telneset is a village in Tynset Municipality in Innlandet county, Norway. The village is located along the river Glåma, about halfway between the villages of Tynset and Tolga. The village lies in Tynset Municipality, but it is right on the border with neighboring Tolga Municipality. 

In 2018, there was a join NATO military exercise in Telneset.

References

Tynset
Villages in Innlandet